A dash is a punctuation mark.

Dash or DASH may also refer to:

Brands and enterprises
 Dash (boutique), a boutique clothing and accessory chain
 Dash (detergent)
 Amazon Dash, a consumer goods ordering service from Amazon.com
 Mrs. Dash, a brand name of seasoning marketed by B&G Foods

Fictional characters
 Dash Parr, in the film The Incredibles
 Dash (Transformers), in Transformers
 Dash Baxter, in the cartoon Danny Phantom
 Dash Boardman, in the film Cars
 Dash Riprock, in the television series The Beverly Hillbillies
 Rainbow Dash, in the My Little Pony television series

Mascots
 Dash, a mascot of PBS Kids from 1999 to 2013

Organizations
 Democratic Movement for Change, an Israeli political party
 Design and Architecture High School, Miami, Florida, US

Military
 Display And Sight Helmet, a helmet for fighter pilots
 Gyrodyne QH-50 DASH (Drone Anti-Submarine Helicopter), a military drone helicopter
 USS Dash (AM-88), a United States Navy minesweeper launched 20 June 1942
 USS Dash (AM-428), a United States Navy minesweeper launched 20 September 1952

Science and technology
 Dash, an element in Morse code
 DASH diet (Dietary Approaches to Stop Hypertension), a diet promoted by the National Institutes of Health to prevent and control hypertension
 Dash Express, a GPS device by Dash Navigation
 DASH7, a low power wireless sensor networking technology
 Digital Audio Stationary Head, a digital audio tape format
 Dynamic allele-specific hybridization, a method of genetic analysis
 Long dash skipper (Polites mystic), a butterfly

Computing
 Dash (shell) (Debian Almquist shell), a Linux shell
 Desktop and mobile Architecture for System Hardware, a computing standard
 Dynamic Adaptive Streaming over HTTP (DASH), (aka MPEG-DASH, DASH Audio, or DASH Video), a multimedia streaming standard
 Unity Dash, a component of the Unity user interface for the Ubuntu operating system
 Sony Dash, an Internet device
 T-Mobile Dash, a smartphone
 Dash, an analytical web app library by Plotly
 Dash (cryptocurrency), an open source peer-to-peer cryptocurrency and decentralized autonomous organization

Sport
 Dash, a sprint race
 Houston Dash, a professional women's soccer team based in Houston, Texas

Transportation

Aircraft
 De Havilland Canada Dash 7, a Canadian turboprop aircraft 
 De Havilland Canada Dash 8, a Canadian turboprop aircraft
 Dash 80, early jet aircraft
 DaSH PA, a human-powered airplane project

Locomotives
 GE Dash 7 Series, a 1970s line of locomotives by GE
 GE Dash 8 Series, a 1980s line of locomotives by GE
 GE Dash 9 Series, a 1990s line of locomotives by GE

Motor vehicles
 Dash, a series of firefighting apparatus (trucks) produced by Pierce Manufacturing
 Dashboard or dash, an automobile component

Public transportation
 DASH (bus), a public transportation system in Alexandria, Virginia, US
 Davidson Avenue Shuttle, bus service for Somerset County, New Jersey, US
 Downtown Area Short Hop, a public transportation system in Los Angeles, California, US
 Downtown Area Shuttle, bus service for Hartford, Connecticut, US
 The DASH, a route run by the Regional Transportation District in Boulder, Colorado, US

People

Given name
 Dash Berlin (born 1979), Dutch musician
 Dash Mihok (born 1974), American actor
 Dash Shaw (born 1983), American comic book writer
 Dash Snow (1981–2009), American artist

Surname
 Dash (rapper), full name Darien Dash (born 1992), American rapper
 Anil Dash (born 1975), American writer
 Charlene Dash, African-American model
 Damon Dash (born 1971), American music executive
 George Dash (1871–1959), New Zealand politician
 Jack Dash (1906–1989), British labor union leader
 Julie Dash (born 1952), American filmmaker
 Julian Dash (1916–1974), American saxophonist
 Leon Dash (born 1944), American journalist
 Mike Dash (born 1963), British writer
 Samuel Dash (1925–2004), American lawyer
 Sarah Dash (1945–2021), American singer 
 Stacey Dash (born 1966), American actress

Nickname or stage name
 Dash Chisako (born 1988), ring name of Japanese professional wrestler Chisako Jumonji
 Dashiell Hammett (1894–1961), nicknamed Dash
 Dash Wilder (born 1987), ring name of American professional wrestler Daniel Wheeler

Other uses
 Dash (cooking), a unit of measurement used in cooking
 Dash (collie), a dog owned by Caroline Harrison
 Dash (spaniel), a dog owned by Queen Victoria
 The Dash, an English post-punk band
 Pebble dash, a surface used on outside walls
 Sonic Dash, a 2013 video game
 Dash Berlin, Dutch trance band

See also
 D-A-CH, three territorial entities where German is an official language
 Daesh, a Salafi jihadist former unrecognised proto-state and militant group (aka ISIS and ISIL)
 DASHED, a food delivery service
 Dashiell, a given name and a surname